A destructive multi-day tornado outbreak across a large portion of the Southern United States that occurred at the end of April and the beginning of May 2010. Five people were killed from the tornadoes – one in Arkansas, one in Tennessee, and three in Mississippi. The tornado event was overshadowed by the 2010 Tennessee floods, which occurred at the same time.

Meteorological synopsis
A strong low-pressure system tracked across the Midwest beginning on April 29. A few tornadoes were reported from Kansas to Iowa that day, but with little damage.

A moderate risk of severe weather was issued on April 30 for a large swath from northern Illinois to southern Arkansas. Late that afternoon, tornadoes began to develop across the Ozarks and multiple tornado warnings were issued. also, in less than a week, another PDS Tornado Watch was issued for Arkansas, Oklahoma, the Missouri Bootheel, and Texas. That evening in central Arkansas, the moderate risk was upgraded to a high risk for the second time in less than a week. Significant damage was reported in several areas. KARK coverage reported that a tornado touched down in Scotland, Arkansas and major damage, at least 25 injuries and 3 fatalities were reported there. In East End, Arkansas, major damage was also reported with several injuries.

Another high risk was issued for May 1 for Arkansas, northern Mississippi, West Tennessee, southwestern Kentucky and southeastern Missouri, the first occurrence of back-to-back high risk days since 2006. Activity began in the afternoon on the warm front, where a destructive tornado touched down in northeastern Mississippi with severe damage near Ripley.
Yet again, another PDS Tornado watch was issued for Arkansas, Louisiana, and Texas. The activity, however, was confirmed primarily to areas closer to the Mississippi River.

The same system also produced copious amounts of rain over much of the Mid-South, with widespread flooding reported in Tennessee. Interstates 40 and 24 had to be shut down in the Nashville area due to water covering those major highways. The flooding was so bad on those two Interstate highways, stranded motorists were rescued in boats.

Confirmed Tornadoes

April 30 event

May 1 event

May 2 event

Flooding

Flooding from thunderstorms in the areas affected was also common, with some places experiencing record flooding. At least  of rain fell in Nashville, Tennessee, breaking the old two-day total record of  set in 1979 by the remnants of Hurricane Frederic.

See also
List of North American tornadoes and tornado outbreaks
List of Storm Prediction Center high risk days

Footnotes

References

04-30
F3 tornadoes by date
Tornadoes in Arkansas
Tornadoes in Missouri
Tornadoes in Tennessee
Tornadoes in Mississippi
Tornadoes in Kentucky
Tornado
Tornado
Tornado